John Parkin was the first mayor when he was elected in 1629. The first woman to serve as mayor was Winifrede Marsden in 1930. Stella Jones MBE has been mayor three times and she was also the mayoress three times when her husband Trevor was mayor.

The following have been elected mayors of Dorchester, Dorset, England:

1629–30: John Parkins, MP for Dorchester, 1621
1631–32: William Whiteway, MP for Dorchester, 1624, 1625
1635–36: Denis Bond MP for Dorchester, 1640
1636–37: John Hill, MP for Dorchester, 1628
1637–38: James Gould, snr, MP for Dorchester, 1659, 1661
1644–45: John Bushrode, MP for Dorchester, 1659
1645–46: John Whiteway, MP for Dorchester, 1654, 1656, 1660
1655–56: John Bushrode, MP for Dorchester, 1659
1658–59: John Whiteway, MP for Dorchester, 1654, 1656, 1660
1677–78: James Gould, jnr, MP for Dorchester, 1677, 1680, 1681, 1690
1680–81: Nicholas Gould MP for Dorchester, 1679
1682: Charles Stoodley 
1683: John Oldis 
1684: William Pitt 
1685: Alexander Haviland 
1686: John Nelson 
1687: George Lester 
1688: Hugh Baker 
1689: Richard Cooper and Thomas Blandford 
1690: Maximilian Gollop 
1691: Daniel Arden 
1692: Thomas Delacourt 
1693: Thomas Seward 
1694: Andrew Loder
1695: John Gollop 
1696: James Gould 
1697: John Yeat 
1698: Robert Weare 
1699: Henry Whiffen 
1700: Richard Samways 
1701: John Haviland 
1702: John Oldis 
1703: Maximilian Gollop

...

1902-03: Stephen D. Allen, Conservative (re-elected)
1930-31:Winifrede Marsden

...

1950-51: Nancy Jackman

...

1988: E. Stella Jones 
1989: Dennis G. Maggs 
1990: Elizabeth G. Boothman 
1991:: M. Diana Dowell 
1992:D. Trevor Jones 
1993: Mary E. (Molly) Rennie 
1994: John H. Antell 
1995: Timothy C.N. Harries 
1996: Peter A.A. Scott 
1997: Richard M. Biggs 
1998: John H. Antell 
1999: Leslie M. Phillips
2000–01: E. Stella Jones 
2001–02: Walter G. Gundry  
2002–03: D. Trevor Jones 
2003–04: Mary E. Rennie 
2004–05: Timothy C. N. Harries 
2005–06: Richard M. Biggs 
2006–07: Robert (Robin) Potter 
2007–08: David J. Barrett 
2008–09: Catherine M. Hebditch 
2009–10: Susan C Hosford 
2010–11: Leslie M. Phillips 
2011–12: Tess James 
2012–13: Andrew J Canning 
2013–14: E.Stella Jones 
2014–15: Peter Mann 
2015–16: Robin Potter 
2016–17: Timothy C. N. Harries 
2017–18: Susan C Hosford 
2018–19: David Taylor 
2019-21: Richard M. Biggs

2021-22: Gareth Jones
2022-23: Janet Hewitt

References

External links